Basil Hayden's is the lightest-bodied bourbon whiskey in the family of Jim Beam small batch bourbons produced by Beam Suntory (a subsidiary of Suntory Holdings of Osaka, Japan). It is 80 proof, in contrast with its three sibling brands of higher alcohol concentration (Knob Creek, Booker's, and Baker's).

The Basil Hayden's bourbon brand was introduced in 1992 and is named in honor of Basil Hayden Sr. Hayden was a distiller, and he used a larger amount of rye in his mash than in some other bourbons.  Later, Hayden's grandson Raymond B. Hayden founded a distillery in Nelson County and named his label "Old Grand-Dad", in honor of his grandfather, which bears a rendering of Basil Sr.'s likeness. When Beam Industries introduced their "small batch" collection, among the four was "Basil Hayden's." The company says it uses a mash identical to Knob Creek, which is similar to that originally utilized by Hayden in 1792.

The brand expression was originally labeled as "Aged 8 Years", but in 2014, the age statement was replaced by "Artfully Aged", indicating that the brand no longer carries an age guarantee.

History of the Haydens

Basil Hayden Sr. was a Maryland Catholic who led a group of twenty-five Catholic families from Maryland into what is now Nelson County, Kentucky (near Bardstown) in 1785. There Hayden donated the land for the first Catholic church west of the Alleghenies and the first Catholic church in what is now the Commonwealth of Kentucky. 

The Heydons (original spelling) emigrated to the Virginia Colony in the 1660s, when much of Britain became inhospitable to Catholics. Francis Hayden, Basil Sr.'s great-grandfather and the first Heydon (then switching to Hayden), moved from Virginia to Maryland in 1678, settling in St. Mary's County on St. Clement's Bay, where the family remained until Basil led his band of Catholic families into present-day Nelson County, Kentucky.  During the American Revolution, Basil Sr. supplied provisions to the Colonial Army.

Hayden's family can be traced back to England (Norfolk) to the period shortly after the Norman Conquest.  One ancestor, Simon de Heydon, was knighted by Richard the Lionheart in the Holy Land during the Third Crusade in the 1190s.  His son, Thomas de Heydon, was made Justice Itinerant of Norfolk by Henry III.  Around 1400, another ancestor, John Heydon, appears to have been associated with "The Grove" – a large estate in Watford (Hertfordshire),  located about twenty miles northwest of London.  Some researchers have speculated that John Heydon was given the estate for his father Sir Richard de Heydon's services in the French Wars, where Sir Richard perished. Others are less sure. But Heydons definitely lived in Watford from the fourteenth through seventeenth centuries.

Reviews
Food critic Morgan Murphy said "The rye-heavy whiskey is aged 8 years and carries a buttery flavor and smooth, tannic finish."

References

Bourbon whiskey
Beam Suntory